Aaron Kwok Fu-shing (born 26 October 1965) is a Hong Kong singer, dancer and actor. Active since the 1980s, Kwok is known as one of the "Four Heavenly Kings" of Hong Kong pop music. Dubbed the "God of Dance", Kwok's onstage dancing is influenced by the late American performer Michael Jackson. He has released over 30 studio albums in Cantonese and Mandarin, mostly in the dance-pop genre, with elements of rock, R&B, soul, electronica and traditional Chinese music.

Concurrently with his music career, Kwok started as an actor with a role in the TVB television drama Genghis Khan (1987), followed by Twilight of a Nation (1988), Man from Guangdong (1991), Heartstrings (1994), and Wars of Bribery (1996). He gained widespread recognition in the movie Saviour of the Soul (1991), for which he was nominated for a Hong Kong Film Award for Best Supporting Actor, before starring in a string of box-office hits, including Future Cops (1993), China Strike Force (2000), Divergence (2005), After This Our Exile (2006), Port of Call (2015), and Project Gutenberg (2018).

Early life
Kwok graduated from St John's Co-education College in Hong Kong. After graduating from secondary school, Kwok worked as a junior staff in King Fook Gold & Jewellery Co. Ltd. His father, who owns a small gold retail store, desired that he gain experience in the business with the view of eventually handing the family business over to him. If not for one of Kwok's brothers taking over the gold business, his father would not have allowed him to join the entertainment industry. In 1984, he was fired for prolonged absenteeism (sick leave) caused by a foot muscle injury from trying the splits at a party.

In 1991, Kwok's older brother, Kwok Fu-kun, was shot dead outside the Sunbeam Theatre in North Point while chasing armed robbers who had raided his Marble Street jewelry store.

Career

Early years
After being fired from a jewellery company in 1984 at the age of 19, Kwok only had a high school education and had never studied dancing in university before. Kwok subsequently joined a dancer training course at TVB, where his talent for dancing was immediately recognized. Kwok then performed in music videos and variety shows for other singers. In 1987, he was transferred to the acting department of the talent training course and became a TV actor, where he played minor parts in TVB dramas. In 1990, he did a TV commercial in Taiwan for the Honda motorcycle DJ-1RR. The commercial gained him instant popularity with Taiwanese girls, and he immediately burst onto the music scene.

Music

Kwok then began his music career with three mandopop albums including the famous song "Loving You Forever" (對你愛不完) to accompany his dance moves. After his success in Taiwan, he returned to Hong Kong in 1991 to do Cantopop. The next few years saw his popularity reach fever-pitch, and he was soon ranked as one of the "Four Heavenly Kings". Kwok became one of Hong Kong and Asia's most prominent pop stars. He won his first major awards with the 1991 Jade Solid Gold Top 10 Awards and 1991 RTHK Top 10 Gold Songs Awards.

Janet Jackson collaborated with Aaron Kwok and Ricky Martin for international versions of "Ask for More", a promotional single and commercial released as part of an advertising campaign for Pepsi. A full-length music video of the version with Kwok was also released in Asian markets.

Dancer
As soon as Kwok entered the music industry in 1991, he started a fast-dancing trend (勁歌熱舞). Kwok's onstage dancing and displays has been known to be influenced by Michael Jackson. Later in his career, he is known to have won a prestigious top ten Hong Kong dance award (十大舞蹈家年獎). Of all the performing arts at which Kwok excels, stage appearances remain his perennial favourite. His dance accomplishments are also matched with stage displays. On 16 November 2007, he held an "Aaron Kwok De Show Reel Live" concert at Hong Kong Coliseum with the largest revolving stage. On 17 February 2008, he held an "Aaron Kwok De Show Reel Extension Live" concert at the Hong Kong AsiaWorld Arena with the largest revolving stage measured at 10m x 9.44m and created a new entry for the Guinness Book of World Records.

Acting
Over the years, Kwok has also been active in other media such as TV commercials and acting.  He began his acting career with the TVB series Rise of Genghis Khan, and the 1988 series Twilight of a Nation about the Taiping Rebellion. One of his more noticeable role was for the 1996 TVB drama series Wars of Bribery where he plays an ICAC special-agent with Athena Chu.

He also starred in various movies. At the Taiwan's 42nd Golden Horse Awards ceremony on 13 November 2005, Kwok was the surprise winner of Best Leading Actor award for his role in the film Divergence. It was Kwok's first Golden Horse nomination and beat veteran Hong Kong star Tony Leung Ka-fai to win the honour. He won the Best Actor Award again at the 43rd Golden Horse Awards on 24 November 2006 for his role in the film After This Our Exile. He became only the second actor in the history of the Golden Horse Awards to win the Best Actor Award consecutively. Jackie Chan first accomplished this back in the 1992-3.

Along with Zhang Ziyi, Kwok stars in an AIDS-themed film Love for Life, which premiered on 10 May 2010.

In 2016, Kwok won his first Hong Kong Film Award for Best Actor for his role in the crime thriller film, Port of Call, at the 35th Hong Kong Film Awards.

Personal life

Kwok married Shanghai-based Chinese model Moka Fang (方媛）and they both are parents to daughters Chantelle Kwok and Charlotte Kwok.

Kwok posted on social media on 18 April 2019 that his second daughter Charlotte Kwok was born.

Hobbies

Kwok is a collector of sports cars as well as a fan of motor racing. He is known as a car fanatic and has a large collection of notable cars. Some of his collection include the Audi R8 GT Spyder, Ferrari F50, F512M, F355 GTS, F360 Modena, Ferrari 599 GTB Fiorano, Ferrari California, Ferrari F430 Spider, Lamborghini Diablo SE30, Mercedes-Benz SL600, Mercedes CLK DTM AMG, Porsche 911 Turbo, Porsche 911 GT3 RS mk2. Other cars include the Enzo Ferrari, a Carbon version Pagani Zonda F, Lamborghini Murciélago, Gallardo, Lamborghini Aventador 50th Anniversario Roadster, Lamborghini Gallardo Superleggera, Porsche 996 GT3, Nissan GT-R.

In 2011, Kwok became a race-horse owner at the Hong Kong Jockey Club. He originally owned two horses: N288 CALLING WITH LOVE and another named P288 MY FAVORITE. In 2018, he purchased a new horse named C180 DANCING FIGHTER.

Kwok is also well known to be a super fan of Chinese hotpot .

Image
He was famous for popularising a new type of "center-split hair style" that was widely imitated during the 1990s. As a fashion icon amongst the show biz industry, throughout his career he changed his hair style numerous times, including styles such as the five-five split and the four-six split. In 2020, he became the brand ambassador of HSBC Jade in Hong Kong with advertisements that shared his own beneficial experience of using its banking services.

Discography
1990
 Loving You Never Stop (Mandarin Debut Album)
1991
 Should I Leave Quietly? 
 Who Can Tell Me Finally? 
1992
 Please Bring My Affection Home (1st Mandarin Compilation)
 Loving You
 Dancing Never Stop, Loving Never Stop, Singing Never Stop (Cantonese Debut Album)
 Marlboro Red Hot Hits: Heat Moves Lalala
1993
 Deep Loving You - Aaron Kwok (2nd Mandarin Compilation)
 Leaving All My Love To You
 Without Your Love
 Dream Can't Be Kept
 Merry X-Mas [Single]
1994
 AK-47 (four new Cantonese songs + Cantonese & Mandarin Compilation)
 Starts From Zero (Cantonese & Mandarin Compilation)
 The Wild City (1st Album released by Warner Music)
 The Horizon
 A Moment Of Romance II OST
 Desire [Single]
 Desire (Japanese Version) [Single]
 Temptation of the Iron Mask
 Elution/Good Gal (Remix)
 Lover For A Whole Life (Mandarin Compilation)
 Romance Iron Mask Moving Temptation (Remix)
1995
 My Starting Point Is Here
 You Are My Everything (EP)
 Pure Legend
 Wind Can't Stop
 Memorandum
 Memorandum (Photo Album)
1996
 Aaron Kwok Golden Songs : Memorandum Collection
 Love Dove
 The GIG Kingdom (EP)
 Listen to the Wind's Song
1997
 Listen to the Wind (karaoke remix)
 Warner MasterSonic Vol 1: Aaron Kwok
 Aaron Kwok Live in Concert 1996
 Who Will Remember Me?
 Love Call
 Duplicate Soul - Duplicate Again (Remix)
 Devoted
 Generation Next
1998
 Code In The Wind
 Warner MasterSonic Vol 2: Aaron Kwok
 Best To Sing Mandarin 1998
 Aaron Kwok The Best Remix
 A Magic To City
 Best Hits of Aaron (songs from his previous label)
1999
 Pepsi Aaron Kwok Live in Concert 1998
 Ask For More (EP)
 Amazing Dream [Album]
 Amazing Dream (Version 2)
 Amazing Dream (Big Box)
 So Afraid
 So Afraid (Happy New Year Version)
 Hip Hip Hurray Greatest 16 Hits 1999
 Hip Hip Hurray Greatest 16 Hits 1999 (Singapore Version, with two Mandarin songs)
2000
 Journey, Cheer
 And I Hate You So OST
 Fascinating
 China Strike Force OST
 Fearless vs Future (EP)
2001
 Pepsi Aaron Kwok Live On Stage 2000/01
 34 Best Choice of Aaron Kwok HDCD (Combination of Warner MasterSonic 1&2)
 Xin Tian Di + Para Para Sakura OST
 Pure Energy Collection
 Absolute
2002
 Aaron Kwok & Friends in Concert 251101
 Beyblade (3"CD, EP)
 Aaron Kwok Nicam Greatest Hits 2002 (Love.Stage)
 Aaron Kwok AA+ Best Hits! (Taiwan Version of Nicam Greatest Hits)
 Burning Flame 2 OST
 The Power Of Love 2002
2003
 In The Still Of The Night
 In The Still of The Night (Special Version)
 Romancing Hong Kong OST
2004
 AK Trilogy Yours Truly Greatest Hits I II III
2005
 Thematic (AVCD, EP)
2006
 My Nation
 My Nation Plus [1 additional single (Kid of Wind)]
 Aaron Kwok: The Best Collection (2DVD + 2CD)
2008
 Aaron Kwok de Show Reel Live in Concert 2007/2008
2009
 Aaron Kwok Greatest Hits (2CD)
2010
 Aaron Kwok Never Ending Love

Filmography

References

External links 

 
 
 Aaron Kwok Management Co. (First Strong Workshop Ltd) 
 Aaron Kwok at AllMovie
 Aaron Kwok at Douban 
 Aaron Kwok at Mtime.com 

1965 births
Living people
20th-century Hong Kong male singers
20th-century Hong Kong male actors
21st-century Hong Kong male singers
21st-century Hong Kong male actors
Cantopop singers
Hong Kong male film actors
Hong Kong male singers
Hong Kong Mandopop singers
Hong Kong male dancers
Hong Kong male television actors
Hong Kong Buddhists
Hong Kong idols
MAMA Award winners